Pepsi-Cola Products Philippines, Inc. (PCPPI) is a Philippines-based company engaged in the bottling and distribution of PepsiCo beverages and snack foods in the Philippines since 1989.

History
Pepsi-Cola Products Philippines, Inc. (PCPPI) was established in 1989 as Premier Beverages by Luis Lorenzo, Sr. to acquire the bottling and distribution rights to PepsiCo beverages in the Philippines.

In 1997, the Guoco Group acquired Lorenzo’s holdings in PCPPI. Under Guoco management,  was spent in 1998 to upgrade the facilities of PCPPI. In  2000, PepsiCo paid P 2 billion to the Guoco Group to acquire a 33% stake in PCPPI. News reports cited the rationale was to ensure PepsiCo had a continuing market for its concentrates, even if it meant infusing money into its licensed bottlers.

PCPPI became listed in the Philippine Stock Exchange in 2008.

In September 2010, Korean-based Lotte Chilsung Beverage Company Ltd. acquired 34% of PCPPI. The acquisition made Lotte Chilsung the largest shareholder in PCPPI. Lotte Chilsung agreed to pay P4.447 billion to buy the 1.27 billion shares from the Guoco Group. In 2013, Lotte Chilsung increased its stake to 39%. As of March 2013, Netherlands-based Quaker Global Investments B.V. is the company’s second largest shareholder with 29.5%.

Pepsi-Cola in the Philippines
On October 16, 1946, John Clarkin acquired a franchise to bottle and distribute Pepsi-Cola in the Philippines, establishing Pepsi-Cola Bottling Company of the Philippine Islands Ltd. Clarkin was a former executive of the Pepsi-Cola Company who came to the Philippines as a member of the US Air Force during the close of World War II. In the beginning, the company imported Pepsi-Cola until 1947, when its first bottling plant was established in Quezon City.

After Clarkin returned to the United States in 1957, PepsiCo International took over the Philippine operations. In 1983, the Philippine operations became a branch of PepsiCo’s New York office - renamed PepsiCo, Inc. (Philippine branch) - and operated until 1985. From 1985 to 1989, Pepsi-Cola Distributors of the Philippines, Inc., a group identified with Filipino businessmen Ernest Escaler and Eduardo Cojuangco, Jr., took over the Philippine franchise.

Recent developments
In June 2013, PCPPI announced that the company would undertake the expansion of its production and distribution capabilities. PCPPI wanted to add three new lines in its existing manufacturing plants in Muntinlupa, Cebu City and Davao City within the year and open a new facility in Santo Tomas, Batangas by the following year. It also hoped to expand its current distribution network of 500,000 locations by about 12% within the year. About 70% of the company’s current sales come from carbonated drinks with the balance coming from non-carbonated drinks.

In May 2015, PCPPI announced that it would begin the manufacture and distribution of Cheetos snacks in the Philippines by the end of the year. The company commenced production at its new facility in Cabuyao, Laguna on February 2016.

Brands

Carbonated:
 Pepsi
 Pepsi Bold Taste
 Pepsi Blue
 7 Up
 Mountain Dew
 Mountain Dew Ice
 Mirinda
 Mug
 Lotte Milkis

Non-carbonated:
 Tropicana 
 Lipton 
 Gatorade 
 G Active by Gatorade
 Gatorade No Sugar
 Sting Energy Drink 
 Aquafina Purified Drinking Water
 Premier Drinking Water
 Ovaltine (discontinued)

Snack foods:
 Cheetos
 Doritos
 Fritos
 Lay's
 Ruffles
 Lay's Stax
 Smartfoods
 Tostitos

Other:
 Quaker Instant Oatmeal
 Knick Knacks

Controversy

See also
 Pepsi Hotshots (PBA team, 1990-1996)

References

External links
Pepsi-Cola Products Philippines, Inc.
Lotte Chilsung Beverage Company Ltd.
PepsiCo, Inc.

PepsiCo bottlers
Drink companies of the Philippines
Snack food manufacturers of the Philippines
Companies of the Philippines
Companies established in 1989
Companies based in Muntinlupa
Companies listed on the Philippine Stock Exchange
Philippine subsidiaries of foreign companies